The 2015–16 Greek Football Cup was the 74th edition of the Greek Football Cup. A total of 34 clubs were accepted to enter. The competition commenced on 9 September 2015 with the preliminary round and was planned to conclude on 23 April 2016 with the final, at the Olympic Stadium.

The cup was cancelled by the Greek government on 3 March 2016, following crowd violence. On 5 April 2016, FIFA Emergency Committee decided to provide the Greek authorities with a deadline to have the cancellation of the competition reversed before 15 April 2016 or the Hellenic Football Federation would face an automatic suspension. The Greek authorities announced on deadline day that the Greek Football Cup will be resumed after an agreement reached with FIFA, UEFA and Hellenic Football Federation.

A new schedule with the remaining match was announced with the final being played on 7 May 2016, but the final was later postponed to 17 May 2016.AEK Athens earned the trophy with a 2–1 win over Olympiacos.

Teams

Calendar

Source:

Participating clubs

Preliminary round
The draw for this round took place on 4 September 2015.

Summary

|}

Matches

Kallithea won 2–0 on aggregate.

Acharnaikos won 1–0 on aggregate.

Group stage
The draw for this round took place on 17 September 2015.

Group A

Group B

Group C

Group D

Group E

Group F

Group G

Group H

Knockout phase
Each tie in the knockout phase, apart from the final, was played over two legs, with each team playing one leg at home. The team that scored more goals on aggregate over the two legs advanced to the next round. If the aggregate score was level, the away goals rule was applied, i.e. the team that scored more goals away from home over the two legs advanced. If away goals were also equal, then extra time was played. The away goals rule was again applied after extra time, i.e. if there were goals scored during extra time and the aggregate score was still level, the visiting team advanced by virtue of more away goals scored. If no goals were scored during extra time, the winners were decided by a penalty shoot-out. In the final, which were played as a single match, if the score was level at the end of normal time, extra time was played, followed by a penalty shoot-out if the score was still level.The mechanism of the draws for each round is as follows:
In the draw for the round of 16, the eight group winners are seeded, and the eight group runners-up are unseeded.The seeded teams are drawn against the unseeded teams, with the seeded teams hosting the second leg.
In the draws for the quarter-finals onwards, there are no seedings, and teams from the same group can be drawn against each other.

Bracket

Round of 16
The draw for this round took place on 18 December 2015.

Seeding

Summary

|}

Matches

Panionios won 2–0 on aggregate.

Atromitos won 2–1 on aggregate.

Olympiacos won 10–1 on aggregate.

Panathinaikos won on away goals.

AEK Athens won 3–0 on aggregate.

Asteras Tripolis won 6–0 on aggregate.

PAOK won 4–2 on aggregate.

Iraklis won 2–0 on aggregate.

Quarter-finals
The draw for this round took place on 15 January 2016.

Summary

|}

Matches

PAOK won on away goals.

Olympiacos won 6–1 on aggregate.

AEK Athens won 5–1 on aggregate.

Atromitos won 1–0 on aggregate.

Semi-finals
The draw for this round took place on 19 February 2016. After the PAOK–Olympiacos match on 2 March being abandoned due to crowd violence, the Cup was cancelled, before being resumed on 15 April 2016. New dates for the competition were announced by Hellenic Football Federation and the other first leg match was played on 20 April while the second leg matches were played on 26 and 27 April 2016.

Summary

|}

Matches

AEK Athens won 2–1 on aggregate.

Match abandoned in the 90th minute with the score at 1–2. It was later awarded as a 0–3 win for Olympiacos.

PAOK didn't show up to the match.

Olympiacos won 6–0 on aggregate.

Final

After the cup was resumed the Hellenic Football Federation announced that the final would be played on 7 May 2016, but it was later postponed to 15 May 2016.  It was again postponed to 17 May 2016.

References

External links
2015–16 Greek Football Cup at the Greek Football Federation site (Greek)

Greek Football Cup seasons
Cup
Greek Cup